HMS Royal James was a 102-gun first rate ship of the line of the Royal Navy, built by Anthony Deane at Portsmouth Dockyard at a cost of £24,000, and launched on 31 March 1671.

She was the first Royal Navy vessel to be assembled using iron as a part of her frame, rather than merely in bolts and nails. Her shipwright, Sir Anthony Deane modified the vessel's plans to include U-shaped iron bars to secure the planking of the hull, despite stern disapproval from Admiralty's representative, the Clerk of the Acts Samuel Pepys. Deane defended his actions by claiming there was a shortage of usable wood. His defence was personally reviewed by the King, Charles II, who upheld the use of iron. However, the innovation was not repeated in other Royal Navy vessels until adoption of the 1719 Establishment nearly fifty years later.

Royal James was also one of only three Royal Navy ships to be equipped with the Rupertinoe naval gun.
She fought at the Battle of Solebay on 7 June 1672 (28 May 1672 O.S.) as Admiral Edward Montagu's flagship. She was attacked by first Dolfijn, and then Groot Hollandia, before finally coming under attack by Dutch fireships. Royal James was destroyed by the fire and sank. Montagu died, although the ship's Captain, Richard Haddock, survived and went on to hold a distinguished career in the Navy. She had seen barely four months service.

Notes

References

Endsor, Richard. (2009) Restoration Warship: The Design, Construction and Career of a Third Rate of Charles II's Navy. London: Anova Books.
Lavery, Brian (2003) The Ship of the Line - Volume 1: The development of the battlefleet 1650-1850. Conway Maritime Press. .
Spencer, Charles. (2007) Prince Rupert: The Last Cavalier. London: Phoenix.

External links
 

Ships of the line of the Royal Navy
1670s ships